Agios Georgios is a village and a community of the Grevena municipality. Before the 2011 local government reform it was a part of the municipality of Irakleotes, of which it was a municipal district and the seat. The 2011 census recorded 452 residents in the village. The community of Agios Georgios covers an area of 23.129 km2.

Name
Agios Georgios was known, until 1927, as Τσούρχλι - Tsourchli.

Demographics
According to the statistics of Vasil Kanchov ("Macedonia, Ethnography and Statistics"), 200 Greek Christians, 400 Vallahades (Grecophone Muslims) and 40 Romani lived in the village in 1900.

Notable people
 Bekir Fikri (1882-1914), Ottoman military officer

See also
 List of settlements in the Grevena regional unit

References

Populated places in Grevena (regional unit)